"Rabbit Heart (Raise It Up)" is a song by English indie rock band Florence and the Machine from their debut studio album Lungs (2009). It was released as the album's third single on 21 June 2009, by Island and Moshi Moshi Records. The song was written by Florence Welch and Paul Epworth, produced by Epworth and mixed by Cenzo Townshend. The song contains elements of "House Jam" by Gang Gang Dance. It has been remixed by numerous artists, including Jamie T, whose remix appears on the single's CD and digital releases.

"Rabbit Heart (Raise It Up)" peaked at number 12 on the UK Singles Chart, becoming the band's third most successful single to date, behind "Spectrum", which peaked at number one, and "You've Got the Love", which reached number five.

Background
"Rabbit Heart (Raise It Up)" features Florence Welch's voice overdubbed with so many harmonies she sounds like a massed choir of one. She confessed to The Independent: "The guy who mixed it nearly had a nervous breakdown."

The song was co-written by Welch together with Paul Epworth who also produced the song which was recorded by Mark Rankin. The track features Tom 'Moth' Monger on harp and Robert Ackroyd on guitar. During the verses, the song features some of the melody and lyrics (e.g. "How quickly the glamour fades") from Gang Gang Dance's song "House Jam".

Florence described her inspiration behind the song:
I'd written all these dark songs, and the label suggested we should have something that was a bit more upbeat. In the process of trying to do that, I realised maybe I was sacrificing something. So I had a really upbeat piano and drums, but the lyrics that came out were 'This is the gift/It comes with a price/ Who is the lamb/And who is the knife?' The rabbit heart is a reference to fear. I'm so afraid of what's about to happen. Of being in the spotlight.

As part of the single's promotion, the band performed the song on The Jonathan Ross Show as well as in BBC Radio 1's Live Lounge. The single was also performed at numerous festivals across the United Kingdom throughout 2009, including Glastonbury, Electric Picnic, Brighton, T in the Park, Bestival and Reading, among others.

The song was also featured as BBC Radio 1's Zane Lowe's "Single of the Week".

Critical reception
"Rabbit Heart (Raise It Up)" received critical acclaim from music critics. Pitchfork Media wrote that Welch "add[s] some welcomed ambiguity to a Paul Epworth production that stunningly internalizes every pseudo-psych/freakishly-folk trend that's passed through these parts over the last few years. 'The looking glass so shiny and new/ How quickly the glamor fades,' wisely observes Welch. A gold record in every way."

Chart performance
On 4 July 2009, "Rabbit Heart (Raise It Up)" debuted at number twelve on the UK Singles Chart. It spent a total of seven weeks in the top twenty, and seventeen in the official top seventy-five, a significantly longer charting period than any of the band's previous three singles. "Rabbit Heart (Raise It Up)" debuted at number forty-two on the Irish Singles Chart on 27 June 2009. The song then went on to peak at number forty-one, spending a total of eight weeks on the chart.

As of July 2018 in United Kingdom the track has shifted 308,000 combined sales and streams.

Music video

The music video for "Rabbit Heart (Raise It Up)" was directed by Tom Beard and Queens of Noize's Tabitha. It was shot on location at Painshill Park in Cobham, Surrey on 6 May 2009. Welch told NME that the video shoot had "a twisted mid summer night's dream feel to it." The video premiered on YouTube on 14 May 2009.

The video starts in a field with a piece of cloth being lifted from in front of Welch's face, before she begins spinning as two girls follow her. The girls then start to dance all around the field, you see a harp being played and then Welch joins in the dancing, doing the bunny hop. Welch sits at a table with six other people, including a man wearing a top hat, there are pig heads served on a plate. Welch and the other six people throw the food on the floor and begin to dance. Welch lies down on the table and the other people lift up the sides to make it into a coffin. The people carry the coffin into the river and it drifts away as the video ends.

Cover versions
English girl group the Sugababes performed the song twice, first in BBC Radio 1's Live Lounge alongside their single "About a Girl" in November 2009 and again at Camden Crawl in 2010.

Track listings
 UK CD single
 "Rabbit Heart (Raise It Up)" (album version) – 3:54
 "Rabbit Heart (Raise It Up)" (Jamie T's Lionheart remix) – 4:49
 "Rabbit Heart (Raise It Up)" (Leo Zero remix) – 8:09

 Digital EP
 "Rabbit Heart (Raise It Up)" – 3:52
 "Are You Hurting the One You Love?" – 2:58
 "Rabbit Heart (Raise It Up)" (Jamie T & Ben Bones Lionheart mix) – 4:50
 "Rabbit Heart (Raise It Up)" (Leo Zero remix) – 8:05
 "Rabbit Heart (Raise It Up)" (Switch mix) – 4:44

 UK 7-inch single
A. "Rabbit Heart (Raise It Up)" – 3:52
B. "Are You Hurting the One You Love?" – 2:58

Charts

Weekly charts

Year-end charts

Release history

References

2009 singles
2009 songs
Florence and the Machine songs
Island Records singles
Song recordings produced by Paul Epworth
Songs written by Florence Welch
Songs written by Paul Epworth